Henrymárcio Bittencourt (born 19 October 1964) is a Brazilian professional football coach, scout and former player who works for Campeonato Brasileiro Série A club Corinthians. 

A defensive midfielder, as a player he spent almost his entire club career with Corinthians, where he won the league title in 1990.

Career

Club career
Bittencourt played for Corinthians and Internacional in the Campeonato Brasileiro Série A.

International career
Bittencourt represented Brazil at the 1991 Copa América.

Coaching career
After retiring as a player, Bittencourt became a football manager and managed Corinthians, Brasiliense, Fortaleza, Juventus-SP, Noroeste, Ipatinga, Santa Cruz, Náutico, Associação Atlética Ponte Preta, Ipatinga, Icasa, Itumbiara, São José-SP and Vila Nova.

Since 2017, he's been working for the Corinthians youth teams, mainly as a scout. In 2021, he took charge of the U20 squad as an interim coach.

References

External links

1964 births
Living people
People from São José dos Campos
Association football midfielders
Brazilian footballers
Brazilian football managers
1991 Copa América players
Brazil international footballers
Campeonato Brasileiro Série A players
Campeonato Brasileiro Série A managers
Campeonato Brasileiro Série B managers
Sport Club Corinthians Paulista players
Sport Club Internacional players
Sport Club Corinthians Paulista managers
Brasiliense Futebol Clube managers
Fortaleza Esporte Clube managers
América Futebol Clube (SP) managers
Clube Atlético Juventus managers
Esporte Clube Noroeste managers
Ipatinga Futebol Clube managers
Santa Cruz Futebol Clube managers
Clube Náutico Capibaribe managers
Associação Atlética Ponte Preta managers
Atlético Monte Azul managers
Volta Redonda Futebol Clube managers
Associação Desportiva Recreativa e Cultural Icasa managers
Itumbiara Esporte Clube managers
São José Esporte Clube managers
Vila Nova Futebol Clube managers
Paulista Futebol Clube managers
Esporte Clube Comercial (MS) managers
Esporte Clube Água Santa managers
Footballers from São Paulo (state)
Sport Club Corinthians Paulista non-playing staff